Romania competed at the 1976 Summer Olympics in Montreal, Canada. 157 competitors, 103 men and 54 women, took part in 92 events in 11 sports.

Medalists

|  style="text-align:left; width:72%; vertical-align:top;"|

| style="text-align:left; width:23%; vertical-align:top;"|

Gold
 Nadia Comăneci — Gymnastics, Women's All-Around Individual 
 Nadia Comăneci — Gymnastics, Women's Asymmetrical Bars 
 Nadia Comăneci — Gymnastics, Women's Balance Beam
 Vasile Dîba — Canoeing, Men's K1 500m Kayak Singles

Silver
 Simion Cuţov — Boxing, Men's Lightweight (– 60 kg)
 Mircea Şimon — Boxing, Men's Heavyweight (– 81 kg)
 Gheorghe Danilov and Gheorghe Simionov — Canoeing, Men's C2 1000m Canadian Pairs 
 Teodora Ungureanu — Gymnastics, Women's Asymmetrical Bars  
 Teodora Ungureanu, Anca Grigoraș, Gabriela Trușcă, Nadia Comăneci, Mariana Constantin, and Georgeta Gabor — Gymnastics, Women's Team Combined Exercises 
 Constantin Tudosie, Radu Voina, Nicolae Munteanu, Cornel Penu, Werner Stöckl, Roland Gunesch, Gabriel Kicsid, Ghiţă Licu, Alexandru Fölker, Cristian Gațu, Mircea Grabovschi, Ştefan Birtalan, Adrian Cosma, and Cezar Drăgăniṭă — Handball, Men's Team Competition
 Gheorghe Berceanu — Wrestling, Men's Greco-Roman Light Flyweight 
 Nicu Ginga — Wrestling, Men's Greco-Roman Flyweight 
 Ștefan Rusu — Wrestling, Men's Greco-Roman Lightweight

Bronze
 Gheorghe Megelea — Athletics, Men's Javelin Throw 
 Victor Zilberman — Boxing, Men's Welterweight (– 67 kg)
 Alec Năstac — Boxing, Men's Middleweight (– 75 kg)
 Kostica Dafinoiu — Boxing, Men's Light Heavyweight (– 81 kg)
 Vasile Dîba — Canoeing, Men's K1 1000m Kayak Singles
 Policarp Malîhin and Larion Serghei — Canoeing, Men's K2 500m Kayak Pairs 
 Alexandru Nilca, Ioan Pop, Dan Irimiciuc, Corneliu Marin, and Marin Mustata — Fencing, Men's Sabre Team Competition
 Danuţ Grecu — Gymnastics, Men's Rings 
 Teodora Ungureanu — Gymnastics, Women's Balance Beam 
 Nadia Comăneci — Gymnastics, Women's Floor Exercises 
 Ioana Tudoran, Felicia Afrăsiloaie, Elena Giurcă, and Maria Micsa — Rowing, Women's Coxed Quadruple Sculls 
 Roman Codreanu — Wrestling, Men's Greco-Roman Super Heavyweight
 Stelica Morcov — Wrestling, Men's Freestyle Light Heavyweight
 Ladislau Simon — Wrestling, Men's Freestyle Super Heavyweight

Athletics

Men's 10.000 metres
 Ilie Floroiu
 Heat — 28:23.40
 Final — 27:59.93 (→ 5th place)

Men's Discus Throw
 Iosif Nagy
 Qualification — 57.28m (→ did not advance)

Women's Javelin Throw
 Éva Ráduly-Zörgő
 Qualification — 55.34 m
 Final — 55.60 m (→ 11th place)

Boxing

Men's Light Flyweight (– 48 kg)
 Remus Cosma 
 1st Round — Lost to Payao Pooltarat (Thailand), 1-4
Men's Bantamweight (54 kg)
  Faredin Ibrahim lost to Gu Yong Jo (North Korea) 1-4
Men's Featherweight (57 kg)
  Gheorghe Ciochină def. Jackson Ouma (Kenya) WO,def. René Weller (West Germany) 4-1, lost to Richard Nowakowski (East Germany) KO 3rd round
Men's Lightweight (60 kg)
  Simion Cuțov def. Silvester Mittee (Great Britain) RSCH 3rd round, def. Nelson Calzadilla (Venezuela) 5-0,def. Ove Lundby (Sweden) 5-0,def. Vasili Solomin (Soviet Union) 5-0, lost to Howard Davis (USA) 0-5 (→  Silver Medal)
Men's Light Welterweight (63.5 kg)
 Calistrat Cuțov def. Jean-Claude Ruiz (France) 5-0, def. Sjamsul Hanrahap (Indonesia) 5-0, lost to Vladimir Kolev (Bulgaria) (0-5)

Men's Welterweight (67 kg)
  Victor Zilberman def. Amon Kotey (Ghana) WO, def. Colin Jones (Great Britain)5-0, def. Carlos Santos (Puerto Rico) 3-2, lost to Jochen Bachfeld (East Germany) 2-3 (→  Bronze Medal)

Men's Light Middleweight (71 kg)
  Vasile Didea def. Michael Prevost (Canada) disq.3rd round, def. Naiden Stanchev (Bulgaria) 3-2, lost to Tadija Kačar (Yugoslavia) 0-5

Men's Middleweight (71 kg)
  Alec Năstac def. Philip Mc. Elwaine (Australia) 3-2, def. Fernando Martins (Brazil) 3-2, lost to Michael Spinks (USA) WO (→  Bronze Medal)

Men's Light Heavyweight (81 kg)
  Costică Dafinoiu def. Robert Nixon (Guyana) WO, def. Robert Burgess (Bermuda) 5-0, lost to Sixto Soria (Cuba) abandon 1st round (→  Bronze Medal)

Men's Heavyweight (+81 kg)
  Mircea Simon def. Trevor Berbick (Jamaica) 5-0, def. Atanas Suvandjiev (Bulgaria) 4-1, def. Clarence Hill (Bermuda) 5-0, lost to Teofilo Stevenson (Cuba) abandon 3rd round (→  Silver Medal)

Canoeing

Fencing

18 fencers, 13 men and 5 women, represented Romania in 1976.

Men's foil
 Petru Kuki
 Mihai Țiu
 Tudor Petruș

Men's team foil
 Petru Kuki, Mihai Țiu, Tudor Petruș, Petrică Buricea

Men's épée
 Nicolae Iorgu
 Paul Szabo
 Anton Pongratz

Men's team épée
 Ioan Popa, Anton Pongratz, Nicolae Iorgu, Paul Szabo

Men's sabre
 Ioan Pop
 Dan Irimiciuc
 Cornel Marin

Men's team sabre
 Dan Irimiciuc, Ioan Pop, Marin Mustață, Cornel Marin, Alexandru Nilca

Women's foil
 Ecaterina Stahl-Iencic
 Magdalena Bartoș
 Ana Derșidan-Ene-Pascu

Women's team foil
 Ileana Gyulai-Drîmbă-Jenei, Marcela Moldovan-Zsak, Ecaterina Stahl-Iencic, Ana Derșidan-Ene-Pascu, Magdalena Bartoș

Gymnastics

Handball

-;Women's Team Competition
Championship Pool
  Lost to East Germany (12-18)
  Lost to Soviet Union (8-14)
  Defeated Japan (21-20)
  Defeated Canada (17-11)
  Lost to Hungary  (15-20)→ 4th place

  Team Roster
  Iuliana Hobincu
  Elisabeta Ionescu
  Rozalia Șooș
  Simona Arghir
  Maria Lackovics
  Georgeta Lăcusta
  Doina Furcoi
  Niculina Sasu
  Cristina Petrovici
 Constantina Pițigoi
  Doina Cojocaru
  Magdalena Miklos
  Maria Bosi
  Viorica Ionică

-;Men's Team Competition
Preliminary Pool, Group B
  Defeated Hungary (23-18)
  Defeated USA (32-19)
  Drew with Czechoslovakia (19-19)
  Defeated Poland (17-15)
Final Round, Gold Medal Match
 Lost to Soviet Union (15-19)(→  Silver Medal)

  Team Roster
  Cornel Penu
  Nicolae Munteanu
  Gabriel Kicsid
  Ghiţă Licu
  Cezar Drăgăniță
  Cristian Gațu
  Radu Voina
  Roland Gunesch
  Alexandru Folker
  Ștefan Birtalan
  Adrian Cosma
  Constantin Tudosie
  Werner Stockl
  Mircea Grabovschi

Rowing

Shooting

Water polo

Men's Team Competition
Team Roster
Adrian Nastasiu
Adrian Schervan
Claudiu Ioan Rusu
Corneliu Rusu
Dinu Popescu
Doru Spînu
Florin Slâvei
Gheorghe Zamfirescu
Ilie Slâvei
Liviu Râducanu
Viorel Rus

Weightlifting

Wrestling

Greco-Roman Wrestling
48 kg
  Gheorghe Berceanu def. Moriwaki(Japan) 4-3, def. Zajączkowski (Poland) fall 0:20, def. Kawasaki (Canada) 14-1, def. Hinz (East Germany) fall 2:08, def. Angelov (Bulgaria) 4-3, lost to Shumakov (Soviet Union) 6-10 (→  Silver Medal)
52 kg
  Nicu Gingă def. Kirov (Bulgaria) injury 5:11, lost to Konstantinov (Soviet Union) 11-17, def. Kraus (West Germany) disq. 7:08, def. Caltabiano (Italy) 11-1, def. Hirayama (Japan) disq. 5:45 (→  Silver Medal)
57 kg
  Mihai Boțilă def. Józef Lipień (Poland) disq., def. Ahn Han Yung (South Korea) 8-0, lost to Mustafin (Soviet Union) 6-14, def. Krysta (Czechoslovakia) 12-0, lost to Pertti Ukkola (Finland) disq. 5:19 →5th place
62 kg
  Ion Păun def. Malmkvist (Sweden) fall 5:40, def. Choi Kyung Soo (South Korea) fall 5:53, def. Hjelt (Finland) 11-4, lost to Miyahara (Japan) 2-6, lost to Réczi (Hungary) injury 1:25 →5th place

68 kg
  Ștefan Rusu def. Andrzej Supron (Poland) 13-1, def. Kim Halmyung (South Korea) fall 2:49, def. Kobayashi (Japan) disq. 3:45, lost to Suren Nalbandyan (Soviet Union) 3-5, def. Wehling (East Germany) disq. 7:45 (→  Silver Medal)

74 kg
  Gheorghe Ciobotaru drew with Karlsson (Sweden) double disqualification, def. Nagatomo (Japan) disq. 6:50,def. Kiss (Austria) fall 5:41, lost to Bykov (Soviet Union) 6-7 →6th place

82 kg
  Ion Enache def. Cummings (Canada) injury 7:40, def. Andersson (Sweden) 6-4, drew with Kolev (Bulgaria) 8-8, lost to Momir Petković (Yugoslavia) 2-3 →7th place

90 kg
  Petre Dicu lost to Sellyei (Hungary) 2-7, lost to Rezantsev (Soviet Union) fall 2:51

100 kg
  Nicolae Martinescu lost to Nikolay Balboshin (Soviet Union) fall 1:23, def. N'diaye (Senegal) fall 2:18, lost to Goranov (Bulgaria) 5:51 →7th place

+100 kg

  Roman Codreanu def. Ronnyai (Hungary) disq. 7:22, def. Robertsson (Sweden) disq. 3:59, def. Wolff (West Germany) disq. 5:15, def. Lee (USA) disq. 7:30, lost to Aleksandr Kolchinski (Soviet Union) fall 0:37, lost to Tomov (Bulgaria) injury 0:32 (→  Bronze Medal)

'

References

Nations at the 1976 Summer Olympics
1976 Summer Olympics
1976 in Romanian sport